"Feeling So Blue" is a song by German musical group Michael Mind Project headed by German music producer and DJ Michael Mind. The single features vocals from American singer Dante Thomas. It was released on 15 June 2012 becoming a hit in France, Germany, Austria and Switzerland.

Sampling and more credits
The song is based on a sample from the well-known 1999 hit "Blue (Da Ba Dee)" by Eiffel 65, as written and composed by Maurizio Lobina, Gianfranco Randone and Massimo Gabutti. Michael Mind Project has also revealed that sample came about after the sample of O-Zone's "Dragostea Din Tei" from the single "Live Your Life" by T.I. and Rihanna. This is the second song to sample Eiffel 65's "Blue (Da Ba Dee)", the other being "Sugar" by Flo Rida.

Charts

See also
Blue (Da Ba Dee)

References

2012 songs
2012 singles
Eurodance songs
Songs written by Jenson Vaughan
Songs written by Maurizio Lobina